The Indian Medical Gazette is an Indian medical journal established in 1866. In its early days, it was closely associated with the Indian Medical Service.

Editors
The following is a partial list of the editors:
 David Boyes Smith (1866)
 John Purefoy Colles (1867)
 Charles K. Francis (1868)
 James Tyrell Carter Ross (1869–70)
 Nottidge Charles MacNamara (1871–73)
 Kenneth McLeod (1871–92)
 John Gay French (1875–76)
 Laurence Austine Waddell (1884–85)
 William John Simpson (1889–97)
 Alexander Crombie (1892–93)

References

External links 

https://www.ncbi.nlm.nih.gov/pmc/journals/2470/

Publications established in 1866
1866 establishments in India
Monthly journals
General medical journals
History of medicine in India
19th-century publications